Vincent de Swarte (15 June 1963 – 24 April 2006) was a French writer author of varied novels ranging from books for youth (Le Carrousel des mers) to crime fictions (Pharricide).

Biography 
After studying political science in Bordeaux, he worked more than a decade in advertising. In 1996, he published a first book for young people entitled Le Carrousel des mers. Two years later appeared Pharricide, a novel centered on a lighthouse keeper adept at taxidermy.
In 1999, the writer received a special mention of the Prix Wepler for his novel Requiem pour un sauvage. He evokes the Chernobyl disaster in Le Paradis existe (2001), chronicle of a village in Ukraine.
He then tries to autofiction tinged with fantasy in Elle et moi (2005).
 
He was carried away by cancer at the age of 43.

Works 
1996: Le Carrousel des mers, littérature jeunesse, Éditions Gallimard
1998: Pharricide, roman, Calmann-Lévy
1999: Requiem pour un sauvage, novel, Prix Wepler
1999: La Chapelle aux oiseaux : conte de Noël, novel, Éditions Pauvert
1999: La Dernière corrida, littérature jeunesse, 
1999: Le Cirque de la lune, littérature jeunesse, Gallimard Jeunesse
2001: Le Paradis existe, novel, Éditions Pauvert
2002: Lynx, novel, Éditions Denoël
2003: Petit Bloï, littérature jeunesse, Gallimard Jeunesse,
2005: Elle est moi, novel, éditions Denoël
2005: Une photo de toi, novel, 
2006: Journal d'un père, autobiography, Éditions Ramsay
2007: Pharanoïa, short stories, Éditions Denoël

Hommage 
In 2006, the éditions Thierry Magnier created "Photo roman", a series in tribute to Vincent de Swart.

References

External links 
 Vincent de Swarte on Babelio
 Vincent de Swarte : im memoriam on Le Littéraire.com (20 October 2012)
 Décès de l'écrivain Vincent de Swarte on L'Obs (27 April 2006)
 Vincent de Swarte, écrivain on Le Monde (26 April 2006)
 Vincent de Swarte on Ricochet-jeunes
 Vincent DE SWARTE on Éditions Thierry Magnier
 Roman: Pharricide par Vincent de Swarte on L'Express (5 November 1998)

20th-century French non-fiction writers
21st-century French non-fiction writers
French children's writers
1963 births
2006 deaths
People from Montauban
Deaths from cancer in France